is a Japanese former racing driver. He participated in 88 Formula One Grands Prix, his best result being third place at the 1990 Japanese Grand Prix. He then became involved in team ownership, with interests firstly in the Japanese Formula Nippon Championship and the IRL in partnership with Mexican racer Adrian Fernandez. He then went on to form Team Aguri, which raced in Formula E from 2014 to 2016.

Career

Early career
Suzuki began racing karts in 1972, at the age of 12. In 1978 he won the Japanese kart championship and in 1979 made his debut in the Japanese Formula Three (All-Japan F3) championship. He continued in karting and in 1981 was again Japanese Kart Champion. In 1983 he finished second in the All-Japan F3 series, driving a Hayashi-Toyota. He then turned to touring car racing and, driving for the Nissan factory team won the Japanese title in 1986. The same year he made his debut in Japanese F2 and drove in the Le Mans 24 Hours. In 1987 he finished runner-up in the Japanese F3000 series, winning one race (Suzuka). In 1988, driving a March-Yamaha he won the title with three wins (Fuji, Nishi-Nippon and Suzuka).

Formula One career
In 1988, Suzuki raced in European F3000 with Footwork, before he debuted in Formula One on October 30 at his home race, replacing the ill Yannick Dalmas in the Larrousse-Lola. Zakspeed, who were using Yamaha engines, hired Suzuki for 1989, but he failed to pre-qualify in all 16 races.

For 1990 and 1991, he drove again for Larrousse. He finished sixth three times, before finishing third at Suzuka – the first ever podium for an Asian driver in F1. He also set the second-fastest lap.

In 1992 and 1993, he was at Footwork alongside Michele Alboreto and then Derek Warwick, but both usually outperformed him. He shared a Ligier with Martin Brundle in 1995, but only scored one point in his races, and was criticised by Mika Salo after the two collided in Buenos Aires. A massive crash in practice for the 1995 Japanese Grand Prix caused a neck injury which saw him miss the race, and he immediately announced his retirement.

Suzuki scored a total of eight championship points in F1. At the time he retired, he was the second most successful Japanese F1 driver after Satoru Nakajima, but Takuma Sato and Kamui Kobayashi have since passed them both.

After Formula One

Suzuki later raced in the All Japan Grand Touring Car Championship, and remained involved in Japanese driver development. In 2000, with long-term sponsor Autobacs, he ran Autobacs Racing Team Aguri, which won the GT300 title in 2002, and expanded to Deutsche Tourenwagen Masters a season later. He also launched Super Aguri Fernandez Racing with Adrian Fernandez, running cars in the Indy Racing League.

From 2006 Suzuki ran the Super Aguri F1 Formula One team with the backing of Honda. He put his new team together in four and half months from his initial announcement on 1 November 2005. The team's initial entry was rejected by the FIA after they failed to secure financial guarantees before the entry deadline, and their acceptance was not formally confirmed until 26 January 2006. The team made its debut at the Bahrain Grand Prix on 12 March 2006. On 6 May 2008, after competing in the opening four races of the season, the team withdrew from Formula One due to financial problems.

Helmet
Suzuki's helmet is white with a red  line with black sides surrounding the top, a red and black line going from the Rear down the chin (forming an A) and a black circle on the top.

Racing record

Career summary

Japanese Top Formula Championship results
(key) (Races in bold indicate pole position) (Races in italics indicate fastest lap)

Complete Macau Grand Prix results

Complete 24 Hours of Le Mans results

Complete International Formula 3000 results
(key) (Races in bold indicate pole position; races in italics indicate fastest lap.)

Complete Formula One results
(key)

Complete Japanese Touring Car Championship (1994-) results

Complete JGTC results
(key)

See also
Super Aguri (disambiguation)
Autobacs Racing Team Aguri (ARTA)
Super Aguri F1

References

External links

Official Site
Driver profile
Suzuki's short biography
An article of Suzuki in French
Suzuki featured at itv-f1.com
Aguri Suzuki's profile and statistics at Formula One DataBase
2005 Super GT GT500 profile
2005 Super GT GT300 profile

1960 births
Living people
Sportspeople from Tokyo
Japanese racing drivers
Japanese Formula One drivers
Sports car racing team owners
IndyCar Series team owners
Formula One team owners
Formula One team principals
Formula E team owners
Japanese Formula Two Championship drivers
Japanese Formula 3000 Championship drivers
Japanese Formula 3 Championship drivers
Japanese Touring Car Championship drivers
International Formula 3000 drivers
24 Hours of Le Mans drivers
Larrousse Formula One drivers
Zakspeed Formula One drivers
Arrows Formula One drivers
Jordan Formula One drivers
Ligier Formula One drivers
World Sportscar Championship drivers
Nismo drivers
TOM'S drivers
Mercedes-AMG Motorsport drivers
Team Aguri drivers
Team LeMans drivers